Bridgeport is a city in Douglas County, Washington. It is part of the Wenatchee−East Wenatchee Metropolitan Statistical Area. Bridgeport's population was 2,409 at the 2010 census. Bridgeport is located near the Chief Joseph Dam.

History
The area that is now Bridgeport was settled in the late 19th century and originally named Westfield. Some of the earliest settlers in the area were Chinese miners extracting gold from the banks of the Columbia River. Developers purchased the town in 1892 and renamed it Bridgeport after where they had come from, Bridgeport, Connecticut. The city of Bridgeport was officially incorporated on March 21, 1910. The biggest economic boom to come to the city came from the building of the massive Foster Creek Dam, later renamed the Chief Joseph Dam, just upstream from the city limits.

Geography

Bridgeport is located at  (48.006238, -119.671540).

Bridgeport has over 1½ miles of Columbia River Waterfront that is within the City Limits. Bridgeport is currently experiencing expansion and development of waterfront properties with a re-newed energy.

Chief Joseph Dam is located upstream about 1½ miles upstream from Bridgeport. Bridgeport is located directly adjacent to the Okanogan County border connected by the north-south Rufus Woods Lake. Its nearby recreational tourism destination is situated in Okanogan County north of the city.

Climate
Bridgeport is tied with Walla Walla for the highest June temperature recorded in Washington state, at 113 °F (45 °C). Both cities set this record during the June 2015 northwest heat wave. Bridgeport beat the previous record high six years later with a high of 115 °F (46 °C) on June 29, 2021.

Demographics

2010 census
As of the census of 2010, there were 2,409 people, 673 households, and 525 families residing in the city. The racial makeup of the city was 57.4% White, 0.5% African American, 0.6% Native American, 0.4% Asian, 38.7% from other races, and 2.4% from two or more races. Hispanic or Latino of any race were 76.7% of the population.

There were 673 households, of which 54.4% had children under the age of 18 living with them, 57.5% were married couples living together, 13.1% had a female householder with no husband present, 7.4% had a male householder with no wife present, and 22.0% were non-families. 15.9% of all households were made up of individuals, and 8.2% had someone living alone who was 65 years of age or older. The average household size was 3.58 and the average family size was 4.00.

The median age in the city was 25.6 years. 37.4% of residents were under the age of 18; 11.7% were between the ages of 18 and 24; 26% were from 25 to 44; 16.7% were from 45 to 64; and 8.3% were 65 years of age or older. The gender makeup of the city was 52.3% male and 47.7% female.

2000 census
As of the census of 2000, there were 2,059 people, 624 households, and 497 families residing in the city. The population density was 1,980.9 people per square mile (764.4/km). There were 762 housing units at an average density of 733.1 per square mile (282.9/km). The racial makeup of the city was 60.81% White, 0.24% African American, 1.94% Native American, 0.19% Asian, 0.10% Pacific Islander, 30.69% from other races, and 6.02% from two or more races. Hispanic or Latino of any race were 64.79% of the population.

There were 624 households, out of which 51.0% had children under the age of 18 living with them, 61.7% were married couples living together, 13.1% had a female householder with no husband present, and 20.2% were non-families. 17.1% of all households were made up of individuals, and 5.9% had someone living alone who was 65 years of age or older. The average household size was 3.30 and the average family size was 3.70.

In the city, the age distribution of the population shows 38.0% under the age of 18, 10.3% from 18 to 24, 28.1% from 25 to 44, 16.0% from 45 to 64, and 7.6% who were 65 years of age or older. The median age was 26 years. For every 100 females, there were 107.1 males. For every 100 females age 18 and over, there were 108.8 males.

The median income for a household in the city was $25,531, and the median income for a family was $26,086. Males had a median income of $22,333 versus $17,788 for females. The per capita income for the city was $10,302. About 28.9% of families and 33.2% of the population were below the poverty line, including 43.2% of those under age 18 and 4.3% of those age 65 or over.

Notable people
 Clyde Pangborn, pioneering aviator

References

External links

 Bridgeport Chamber of Commerce
 

Cities in Washington (state)
Cities in Douglas County, Washington
Wenatchee–East Wenatchee metropolitan area
Chinese-American culture in Washington (state)
Populated places in the Okanogan
Washington (state) populated places on the Columbia River